The discography of Primal Scream, a Scottish rock band, consists of eleven studio albums, twenty-six singles, one EP, two greatest hits albums, two live albums, and one remix album. They also released a joint live CD and DVD with MC5 titled Black to Comm, recorded at the 2008 Meltdown festival.

Albums

Studio albums

Compilation albums

Remix albums

Live albums

Extended plays

Singles

Videos

References

External Links
 

Discographies of British artists
Rock music group discographies